James Cracraft is an historian of Russia who is professor emeritus of history at the University of Illinois. He was a Guggenheim Fellow in 1999.

Selected publications
 The Church Reform of Peter the Great. Stanford University Press, 1971.
 For God and Peter the Great: The Works of Thomas Consett, 1723-1729. East European Monographs 96/Columbia University Press, 1981. (Editor)
 The Soviet Union Today: An Interpretive Guide. University of Chicago Press, 1983. (Editor, joint author)
 The Petrine Revolution in Russian Architecture. University of Chicago Press, 1988.
 Peter the Great Transforms Russia. Houghton Mifflin Harcourt, 1991. (Editor, joint author.)
 Major Problems in the History of Imperial Russia. Houghton Mifflin Harcourt, 1994. (Editor, joint author.)
 The Petrine Revolution in Russian Imagery. University of Chicago Press, 1997.
 The Revolution of Peter the Great. Harvard University Press, 2003.
 Architectures of Russian Identity: 1500 to the Present. Cornell University Press, 2003. (Co-editor with Daniel Rowland, joint author.)
 The Petrine Revolution in Russian Culture. The Belknap Press of Harvard University Press, 2004.
 Two Shining Souls: Jane Addams, Leo Tolstoy, and the Quest for Global Peace. Lexington Books, 2012.

See also
 Lindsey Hughes

References

External links 
http://www.jamescracraft.org/

21st-century American historians
American male non-fiction writers
Historians of Russia
Living people
Year of birth missing (living people)
University of Illinois faculty
Independent scholars
21st-century American male writers